Michipicoten, a word in the Ojibwe language meaning "big bluffs," can refer to:

Places in Ontario, Canada
Michipicoten Provincial Park
Michipicoten River
Michipicoten Island, an island in Lake Superior that is also an Ontario Parks provincial park
Michipicoten First Nation, an Ojibway First Nation band government
Wawa, Ontario, formerly known as Michipicoten Township
 includes the communities of Michipicoten Harbour and Michipicoten River

Other
Michipicoten (ship, 1952), a lake freighter operated by Lower Lakes Towing